Tommy Hansson (born 9 January 1956) is a former Swedish footballer. Hansson is notable for scoring the goal that made his club Malmö FF advance to the 1979 European Cup Final.

Honours

Club
Malmö FF
Allsvenskan: 1977

References

1956 births
Swedish footballers
Malmö FF players
Allsvenskan players
Living people
Association football forwards